Justin Bradley Olsen (born April 16, 1987) is an American bobsledder who has competed since 2008. He won two medals at the 2009 FIBT World Championships in Lake Placid, New York, with a gold in the four-man and a bronze in the mixed team events. Olsen's best event bobsleigh World Cup finish was second on three occasions in 2008–09. Olsen won a gold medal at the 2010 Vancouver Olympics in the four-man bobsled with driver Steve Holcomb.

He is a native of San Antonio, Texas, and a graduate of Sandra Day O'Connor High School.

Following a groin injury in June 2013 which left Olsen out of training for two months, he was later replaced on his original four-man bobsled team for the 2013–2014 season.  His new team, composed of him, Nick Cunningham, Johnny Quinn, and Dallas Robinson, finished twelfth at the 2014 Winter Olympics.

Personal life

Military
Justin is a soldier in the New York Army National Guard and a member of the U.S. Army World Class Athlete Program. He served at the Joint-Force Headquarters in New York.

References

External links

 
 

1987 births
Living people
American male bobsledders
Bobsledders at the 2010 Winter Olympics
Bobsledders at the 2014 Winter Olympics
Bobsledders at the 2018 Winter Olympics
Medalists at the 2010 Winter Olympics
New York National Guard personnel
Olympic gold medalists for the United States in bobsleigh
Sportspeople from San Antonio
United States Army non-commissioned officers
U.S. Army World Class Athlete Program
21st-century American people